Olivier is a given name which may refer to:

People:
 Olivier, Baron de Brandois (1870–1916), French Olympic sailor
 Olivier, Count of Penthièvre (died 1433), French noble
 Olivier Assayas (born 1955), French film director, screenwriter and film critic
 Olivier Berggruen (born 1963), German-American art historian
 Olivier Besancenot (born 1974), French politician and trade unionist 
 Olivier Blanchard (born 1948), chief economist at the International Monetary Fund
 Olivier Brunel (c. 1552–1585), Flemish explorer
 Olivier Chastel (born 1964), Belgian government minister
 Olivier de Clisson (1336–1407), Breton soldier
 Olivier Coipel, French comic book artist
 Olivier Cresp (born 1955), French perfumer
 Olivier Dacourt (born 1974), French former footballer
 Olivier Dahan (born 1967), French director and screenwriter
 Olivier le Daim (c. 1428–1484), born Olivier de Neckere, Flemish valet to King Louis XI of France
 Olivier Dassault (born 1951), French politician
 Olivier De Schutter (born 1968), Belgian legal scholar
 Olivier Debarre (born 1959), French mathematician 
 Olivier Delaître (born 1967), French tennis player
 Olivier Deschacht (born 1981), Belgian footballer
 Olivier van Deuren (1666–1714), Dutch painter
 Olivier Doleuze (born 1972), French jockey
 Olivier Dubois (born 1972), French choreographer
 Olivier Ducastel (born 1962), French film director
 Olivier Elzer (born 1979), French chef
 Olivier Gendebien (1924–1998), Belgian racing driver
 Olivier Giroud (born 1986), French footballer
 Olivier Gourmet (born 1963), Belgian actor
 Olivier Grouillard (born 1958), French racing driver
 Olivier Hanlan (born 1993), Canadian basketball player
 Olivier Jacque (born 1973), French motorcycle racer
 Olivier Jean (born 1984), Canadian speed skater
 Olivier Kapo (born 1980), Côte d'Ivoire-born French footballer
Olivier Latry (born 1962), French organist and improviser
 Olivier Le Jeune (died 1654), first recorded slave purchased in New France
 Olivier Le Peuch (born 1963/1964), French businessman, CEO of Schlumberger
 Olivier de la Marche (1425–1502), Burgundian courtier, soldier, chronicler and poet 
 Olivier Levasseur (c. 1680–1730), French pirate
 Olivier Martinez (born 1966), French actor
 Olivier Megaton (born 1965), French film director, writer and editor born Olivier Fontana
 Olivier Messiaen (1908–1992), French composer, organist and ornithologist
 Olivier van Noort (1558–1627), Dutch merchant captain who circumnavigated the world in 1600-01
 Olivier Occéan (born 1981), Canadian soccer player
 Olivier Panis (born 1966), French Formula One driver
 Olivier Patience (born 1980), French tennis player
 Olivier Perrault (1773–1827), seigneur, lawyer, judge and political figure in Lower Canada
 Olivier Philippaerts (born 1993), Belgian show jumping rider
 Olivier Pla (born 1981), French racing driver
 Olivier Rochus (born 1981), Belgian tennis player
 Olivier Rolin (born 1947), French writer
 Olivier Roy (professor) (born 1949), French political scientist
 Olivier Sarkozy (born 1969), French banker, half-brother of Nicholas Sarkozy
 Olivier Schoenfelder (born 1977), French ice dancer
 Olivier Siegelaar (born 1986), Dutch rower
 Olivier Strebelle (1927–2017), Belgian sculptor
 Olivier Theyskens (born 1977), Belgian fashion designer
 Olivier Tielemans (born 1984), Dutch race car driver
 Olivier Vernon (born 1990), American football player
 Olivier Weber (born 1958), French writer, novelist and reporter 

Fictional characters:
 Oliver (paladin) or Olivier, in the French epic The Song of Roland
 Olivier (comics), a demonic villain and enemy of the Punisher in Marvel Comics
 Olivier Armstrong, in the Japanese manga series Fullmetal Alchemist
 Oliver B. Bumble, Olivier B. Bommel in Dutch, protagonist in the Dutch comic book series Tom Puss

See also
 Oliver (given name)

French masculine given names
Dutch masculine given names